Francis Mawson Rattenbury (11 October 1867 – 28 March 1935) was a British architect although most of his career was spent in British Columbia, Canada, where he designed the province's legislative building among other public commissions. Divorced amid scandal, he was murdered in England at the age of 67 by his second wife's lover.

Architectural career
Rattenbury was born in 1867 in Leeds, England. He began his architectural career with an apprenticeship in 1884 to the "Lockwood and Mawson Company" in England, where he worked until he left for Canada. In 1891, he arrived in Vancouver, in the Canadian province of British Columbia.

The province, anxious to show its growing economic, social and political status, was engaged in an architectural competition to build a new legislative building in Victoria. The new immigrant entered, signing his drawings with the pseudonym "A B.C. Architect," and won the competition. Despite many problems, including going over-budget by $400,000, the British Columbia Parliament Buildings were officially opened in 1898. The grand scale of its -long facade, central dome and two end pavilions, the richness of its white marble, and its use of the currently-popular Romanesque style contributed to its being seen as an impressive monument for the new province. Rattenbury's success in the competition garnered him many commissions in Victoria and other parts of the province, including additions to the Legislative Buildings in 1913–1915. In 1900 he was commissioned to design the 18 bedroom, three story Burns Manor in Calgary for his close friend Pat Burns.

He designed Paardeburg Gate (1901), a memorial to South African war soldiers opposite the Legislative Buildings, 1901.

Rattenbury worked for the Canadian Pacific Railway as their Western Division Architect. His best known work for the CPR was a Chateau-style hotel, The Empress, which was built in 1904–1908 in Victoria, with two wings added in 1909–1914. The architect, however, fell out with the CPR and then joined their competition, the Grand Trunk Pacific Railway. He designed many hotels and stations for the GTP, but they were never completed because of the death of the president, Charles Melville Hays, in the sinking of the RMS Titanic and the company's subsequent bankruptcy. The CPR allowed him to return, however, and he built the second CPR Steamship Terminal in Victoria in 1923–1924 in association with another architect, Percy James. Rattenbury and James also collaborated in the design of the Crystal Garden at the same time although they later had a public conflict over Rattenbury's refusal to give James credit and payment for his work on the Garden.

Just as quickly as he became popular, Rattenbury and his architecture fell out of favour. Perhaps a symptom of his waning popularity, he lost the competition to build the Saskatchewan Legislative Building, built 1908–1912 in Regina, to E. and W.S. Maxwell, two Montreal architects trained at the École des Beaux-Arts in Paris. In contrast to the Maxwells, Rattenbury had no formal training in architecture, and with increasing professionalism, he was soon outpaced by better-trained and better-educated architects.

Personal life

At 25 years old Rattenbury moved to Vancouver and placed an ad in The Vancouver Daily World announcing his arrival along with the credentials of having been trained by the influential English architect Henry Francis Lockwood (1811-1878), although Lockwood had died when Rattenbury was just 11 years old.

Soon after winning the competition for the Legislative Buildings in Victoria, Rattenbury was involved in a series of financial ventures. He planned to supply meat and cattle to prospectors during the Klondike Gold Rush and he ordered three steam trains to serve the Yukon Territory. The investments eventually became profitable. After World War I, however, his luck turned sour with the failure of some financial speculations, eventually leading to conflicts with his business partners.

His personal life also began to show strains at this time. In 1923, he left his wife Florence Eleanor Nunn, whom he had married in 1898, and his adult children, Frank and Mary, for the 27-year-old, twice-married Alma Pakenham. His maltreatment of Florence, which included having the heating and lights turned off in their home after he moved out and the public flaunting of his affair with Alma, led his former clients and associates to shun him, and the couple soon left Victoria. 

He married Alma in 1925 after Florence agreed to his request for divorce. He and Alma returned to Victoria in 1927 with Christopher, her son from her second marriage. There, they had a son of their own, John, before deciding to move to Bournemouth, England, in 1929, the same year that Florence died.

Murder
In Bournemouth, Rattenbury's financial problems continued, causing his relationship with Alma to deteriorate. She began an affair with George Percy Stoner (19 November 1916 – 24 March 2000), their 18-year-old chauffeur. Stoner had been recruited through an advertisement in the Bournemouth Daily Echo and had been living a sheltered, largely-friendless life with his parents before he moved into the Rattenburys' home, the 'Villa Madeira', in Manor Road.

In the early hours of 23 March 1935, Rattenbury was discovered in his sitting room with severe head injuries. He had sustained a series of blows with a carpenter's mallet, the blows savage enough to remove the back of his skull and to cause his false teeth to fall out; he died four days later. His wife confessed, but Stoner admitted to the housekeeper that he had actually carried out the deed. Alma Rattenbury and Stoner were both charged although Alma was to retract her confession after her elder son Christopher visited her in prison. Stoner was convicted and sentenced to death, which was commuted to life imprisonment following the submission to the Home Secretary of a petition signed by over 300,000 people, who felt that the young man had been manipulated into committing murder by the older woman.

Alma, represented by Ewen Montagu, was acquitted of murder and of being an accessory after the fact but committed suicide a few days later on 4 June 1935, stabbing herself with a dagger six times in the chest (three of which penetrated her heart), before throwing herself into the River Stour at Christchurch.

Stoner served only seven years of his sentence since he was released early to join the army and fight in the Second World War. He married in 1944 and fathered a daughter in 1948. He and his wife led "a quiet life" in the Bournemouth area although he briefly attracted the attention of the media again when he was given two years' probation for indecently assaulting a 12-year-old boy in a public toilet in 1990. It is possible Stoner was already suffering from Alzheimer's disease at the time of the offence; he died aged 83 at Christchurch Hospital in 2000.

Despite Francis Rattenbury's outstanding career as an architect, he was buried in an unmarked grave in a cemetery close to his home in Bournemouth. In 2007, a headstone was erected as a lasting memorial, paid for by a family friend.

Cultural references
 In 1937, playwright and actor Emlyn Williams suggested to producer Alexander Korda the idea of making a film about "the Rattenbury murder case" with actors Laurence Olivier and Merle Oberon. Williams then joined Oberon in the cast of Korda's film I, Claudius instead. A television play based on the case, Killer In Close-Up: The Rattenbury Case, written by George F. Kerr, and  produced by Melbourne television station ABV-2, was broadcast on June 18, 1958.
 The case was the basis of the radio and stage play Cause Célèbre by Sir Terence Rattigan. A British television adaptation of the Rattigan play was produced by Anglia and shown on ITV on August 23, 1987.
 A chamber opera by the composer Tobin Stokes, Rattenbury, based on the architect's fall from grace, was performed in concert in Powell River, British Columbia on April 7, 2016, with Richard Margison as Rattenbury and Kathleen Brett as Alma. A full-scale production was performed in Victoria, the home of Rattenburry's parliament buildings, in 2017.
 The 2014 Sarah Waters' novel The Paying Guests was part inspired by the murder.
 The 2018 novel Our Friends In Berlin by the author Anthony Quinn mentions the trial as part of its historical background.
 Sean O'Connor's 2019 account of the case The Fatal Passion of Alma Rattenbury suggested that the sensational treatment of the murder in the tabloid press was the reason for Rattenbury's suicide shortly after her acquittal.

Gallery of his work

List of buildings
Roedde House, Vancouver (1893)
Nanaimo Court House, Nanaimo (1895)
Bank of Montreal, Victoria (1896) (now the Irish Times Pub)
Bank of Montreal, Rossland (1898)
Bank of Montreal, Nelson (1899)
Lieutenant Governor's Residence, Victoria (1901, destroyed by fire in 1957)
Victoria High School (Fort Street location), Victoria (1901, demolished in 1953)
Phoenix Hospital, Phoenix (1901, demolished)
Burns  manor (1903)
Janet Clay House, Victoria (1904)
Merchant's Bank, Victoria (1907)
Court House, Nelson (Designed 1903, completed November 1908, supervising local architect, Alexander Carrie)
Pacific Railway Steamship Terminal, Victoria (1923–1924)
Crystal Garden, Victoria (1925)
Merchants Bank, Nanaimo (1909–1911) (now The Vault Cafe)

Notes

Biography

External links
 
 
 Min doc about Francis Rattenbury
 
 
 Fulford article, Globe & Mail 27 May, 1998
 Headstone at last for victim of 1930s murder The Daily Telegraph 19 November 2007
 Historic Places in Canada
 Historic Bank of Montreal Rossland

1867 births
1935 deaths
English expatriates in Canada
Canadian architects
Deaths by beating in the United Kingdom
Architects from Leeds
People from Victoria, British Columbia
People murdered in England

Canadian murder victims
Canadian people murdered abroad
1935 murders in the United Kingdom
1935 in England
People from Bournemouth